Taylor Morris (born 1 July 2000) is an American-Israeli figure skater who represents Israel in women's singles. She is the 2021 Israeli national champion and the 2019 Israeli national bronze medalist.

Programs

Competitive highlights

Detailed results 
Small medals for short and free programs awarded only at ISU Championships.

ISU Personal best in bold.

Senior results

References

External links 

 

2000 births
Living people
Israeli female single skaters